Night in paintings may refer to:
Night in paintings (Western art)
Night in paintings (Eastern art)